Tîrnauca (Romanian; , Ternivka, Ternovka) is a commune and village in the Slobozia District of the Left Bank of the Dniester, Moldova, situated on the east bank of the river Dniester, between Tighina and Tiraspol. It is notable for being home to the largest bottle-shaped building in the world, the Butylka hotel and museum.

Communes of Transnistria
Slobozia District